Lijnden is a hamlet in the Dutch province of Gelderland. It is located in the municipality of Overbetuwe, about 2 km west of the town of Elst.

It was first mentioned in the 11th century as Haimo de Lino. The etymology is unknown. It is not a statistical entity, and the postal authorities have placed it under Elst. In 1840, it was home to 337 people.

References

Populated places in Gelderland
Overbetuwe